Ernest Charles Jones (25 January 181926 January 1869) was an English poet, novelist and Chartist. Dorothy Thompson points out that Jones was born into the landed gentry, became a barrister, and left a large documentary record. "He is the best-remembered of the Chartist leaders, among the pioneers of the modern Labour movement, and a friend of both Marx and Engels."

Early life 
Jones was born on 25 January 1819 in Berlin, while his parents were visiting the Prussian court. He was the son of a British Army Major named Charles Gustavus Jones, equerry to the Duke of Cumberland, afterwards King of Hanover. In 1838 Jones came to England, and in 1841 published anonymously The Wood-Spirit, a romantic novel. This was followed by some songs and poems. He entered the Middle Temple in 1841 and on 20 April 1844 he was called to the bar.

Chartism 
In 1845, he joined the Chartist agitation, quickly becoming its most prominent figure, and vigorously carrying on the party's campaign on the platform and in the press. His speeches, in which he openly advocated physical force, led to his prosecution, and he was sentenced in 1848 to two years' imprisonment for seditious speeches. While in prison he wrote, it is said in his own blood on leaves torn from a prayer-book, The Revolt of Hindostan, an epic poem.

Upon his release from prison, he conducted a Chartist newspaper: the Notes to The People (1850–1852). He became a leading figure in the "National Charter Association" in the phase of its decline, together with his friend George Julian Harney, and helped to give the Chartist movement a clearer socialist direction. Following the closing of Notes to The People, Jones launched another Chartist publication, the People's Paper in May 1852.

Jones knew Karl Marx and Friedrich Engels personally. Marx and Engels at the same time commented on the Chartist movement and Jones' work in their letters and articles: Marx described Jones as "the most talented, consistent and energetic representative of Chartism". Marx also contributed to Notes to The People: two articles on the French Revolution of 1848 were credited to him, he co-authored six more with Jones, and according to Marx, he also made contributions to all articles on economics published in the paper from 1851 to 1852, which constituted two-thirds of articles appearing in the publication. He also contributed 25 articles to the People's Paper. Jones, a strident anti-imperialist, has been credited as an influence on Marx's views regarding colonialism, which shifted during the 1850s from seeing imperialism as a progressive, modernising force to regarding it as having a destructive effect on colonised societies: Jones' imprisonment had come about after he had given a speech in east London advocating for the independence of Ireland from British control, and wrote a series of articles in the People's Paper in 1853 expressing the hope that the sepoys of the Presidency armies would turn against the rule of the East India Company to launch a struggle for Indian independence, prefiguring the 1857 rebellion by four years.

However, Jones was almost the National Charter Association's only public speaker; he was out of sympathy with the other leading Chartists, and soon joined the advanced Radical party. Jones was a member of the Manchester section of the International Workingmen's Association.

Return to Convention 
Afterwards, when the political and social agitation had died down, he returned to his practice as a barrister, which he had deserted, and also wrote largely. He produced a number of novels, including The Maid of Warsaw and Woman's Wrongs, also some poems, The Painter of Florence, The Battle Day (1855), The Revolt of Hindostan (1857), and Corayda (1859). Some of his lyrics, such as The Song of the Poor, The Song of the Day Labourers, and The Factory Slave, were well known.

Death 
He made several unsuccessful attempts to enter parliament and was about to contest Manchester, with the certainty of being returned, when he died in Ardwick, Manchester in 1869. He is buried in Ardwick Cemetery. He is believed to have sacrificed a considerable fortune rather than abandon his Chartist principles. His wife was Jane Atherley; and his son, Llewellyn Atherley-Jones, K.C. (1851–1929), was a barrister and Liberal Member of Parliament.

Works 

 Infantine effusions. F. H. Nestler, Hamburg 1830 Digitalisat
 The Wood-Spirit. A Novel. T. W. Boone, London 1841  Band 1 Digitalisat
 Fergus O'Connor, Ernst Charles Jones (Hrsg.): The Labourer; A monthly magazin of politics, literature, poetry & c. Bd. 1. Northern Star Office, Manchester 1847 Digitalisat
 Fergus O'Connor, Ernst Charles Jones (Hrsg.): The Labourer; A monthly magazin of politics, literature, poetry & c. Bd. 2. Northern Star Office, Manchester 1847 Digitalisat
 Fergus O'Connor, Ernst Charles Jones (Hrsg.): The Labourer; A monthly magazin of politics, literature, poetry & c. Nd. 3. Northern Star Office, Manchester 1848 Digitalisat
 Fergus O'Connor, Ernst Charles Jones (Hrsg.): The Labourer; A monthly magazin of politics, literature, poetry & c. Northern Star Office, Manchester 1848 Digitalisat
 Hrsg.: Notes to the People. The Champion of Political Justice and Universal Right.  London May 1851 until 1858 Digitalisat 1851
 Co-operation. In: Notes to the People. Nro. 21. September, 20th 1851
 Three to One. In: Notes to the People. Nro. 26  25 September 1851
 What Is Kossuth? In: Notes to the People. Nro. 31 vom 29 November 1851
 Erklärung gegen Karl Heinzen. Übersetzt von Jenny Marx. London March 1852, 3rd.
 The Coming Crisis and why It Is Coming. In: Notes to the People. Nro. 16 August, 21st 1852
 The Storm's First Thunder. In: Notes to the People. Nro. 42 February, 19th 1853
 A Phamphlet on the „Revelations Concerning the Trial of the Communists at Cololone. In: Notes to the People. Nro. 47 26. 26 March 1853
 Secret Intrigue of Russian Tools, and Scandalous Doings of "Our" Cabinet in the East. In: Notes to the People. Nro. 86 24. Dezember, 24th 1853
 Different Features of Popular Feeling. In: Notes to the People. Nro. 103 April, 22nd  1854
 Discoveries Made Too Late. In: Notes to the People. Nro. 130 28. Oktober, 28th 1854
 The Maid of Warsaw, or the Tyrant Czar: a tale of the last Polish Insurrection. London 1854
 Woman's Wrongs. A series of tales. London 1855
 Evenings with the People. The Franchise and Taxation, an address. London 1856  Digitalisat
 Evenings with the people. The unemployed. London 1857
 The revolut of Hindostan; or the new world. A. poem. Wilson, London 1857
 Corayda. A Tale of Faith and Chibalry, and other poems. W. Kent & Co., London 1860 Digitalisat
 Communist Party of Great Britain History Group Corporation (Hrsg.): Diary of Ernest Jones 1839–47. Hammersmith, London 1961 (Our history 21)

Notes

References

General references

Attribution

Further reading 
 The Queen against Ernest Jones. Trial of Ernest Charles Jones for sedition and unlawful assembly at the Central Criminal Court before Wilde, C.J., 10 July 1848. o. O. 1848
 James Crossley: Ernest Jones. Who is he? What has he done?.  A. Heywood, Manchester 1857
 Wm. Sharman: Reform or revolution. Songs for the march. Dedicated by permission to Ernest Jones, confessor for freedom in 1848. Collected and edited by the Rev. Wm. Sharman, Bradford. F. Farrah, London 1867
 The life and death of Ernest Jones the Chartist reformer. A memoir. Manchester 1869
 Frederick Leary: The Life of Ernest Jones. "Democrat" Publishing Office, London 1887 Digitalisat
 George Douglas Howard Cole: Ernest Jones. In: derselbe: Chartist portraits. Macmillan, London 1941 
 Charlotte Alice Faber: Ernest Jones and the Chartist movement. University of Wisconsin 1904 Digitalisat
 Ernest Jones and Chartism c. 1856. In: International Institute of Social History. Bulletin of the International Institute for Social History, Amsterdam. Brill, Leiden 1950  Bd. 5.1950, 2 (08), pp. 99–104
 Ernst Jones. Chartist. Selections from the writings and speeches of Ernest Jones with introd. and notes by John Saville. Lawrence & Wishart, London 1952
 de J, Fr.: An Open Letter from Ernest Jones to Weydemeyer. In: International Institute of Social History. Bulletin of the International Institute for Social History, Amsterdam. Brill, Leiden 1952  Bd. 7.1952, 3 (Dez.), pp. 181–189
 W. Galkin: Ernest Jones. In: Marx und Engels und die ersten proletarischen Revolutionäre. Dietz Verlag, Berlin 1965, pp. 456–496 und 551–554
 Hans-Jürgen Bochinski: Zu den Indien-Artikeln von Ernest Jones aus dem Jahre 1853. In: Beiträge zur Marx-Engels-Forschung 3, Berlin 1978, pp. 37–44
 Stephan Lieske: Der Chartistenführer Ernest Jones. Sein Beitrag zur Entwicklung einer proletarischen Dichtung. Potsdam 1985 (Potsdam, Pädagog. Hochschule, Hist.-Phil. Fak., Dis. (A), 1985)
 Ingolf Neunübel: Marx' und Engels' Einfluß auf Ernest Jones' Chartistenblätter "Notes to the People" und "The People's Paper" (1851/1852).  In: Marx-Engels-Jahrbuch 8, Dietz Verlag, Berlin 1985, pp. 153–187
 Ingolf Neunübel: Über die Beziehungen von Karl Marx und Friedrich Engels zur Chartistenbewegung in den fünfziger Jahren des 19. Jahrhunderts. Ihre Zusammenarbeit mit dem Führer der revolutionären Chartisten * Ingolf Neunübel:Ernest Jones im Kampf um die Reorganisation des Chartismus auf revolutionärer Grundlage. Berlin 1986 (Institut für Marxismus-Leninismus beim ZK der SED, Diss., 1986) 
 Ingolf Neunübel: Zu einigen ausgewählten Fragen und Problemen der Zusammenarbeit von Marx und Engels mit dem Führer der revolutionären Chartisten, Ernest Jones, im Jahre 1854. In: Beiträge zur Marx-Engels-Forschung 22. 1987, pp. 208–217
 Miles Taylor: Ernest Jones, Chartism and the Romance of Politics, 1819 – 1869, Oxford University Press 2003.

 External links 
 Musings, information & illustrations about the Chartists from Stephen Roberts
 Ursula Stange: Annotated Bibliography on Chartism and Ernest Charles Jones
 Chartist Ancestors: Where Are They Now includes an account of Jones's funeral
 Ernest Charles Jones: Chartist and Reformer – biography & selected writings at gerald-massey.org.uk
 
 
 
 Lyrics to "The Song of the Lower Classes,"'' set to music and recorded by Martin Carthy

1819 births
1869 deaths
Chartists
British poets
British socialists
English socialists
British male poets
19th-century poets